Twin Murders: The Silence of the White City is a 2019 Spanish action adventure psychological mystery crime-thriller film directed by Daniel Calparsoro. The film was adapted from a novel written by Eva García Sáenz de Urturi. The film stars Belén Rueda, Javier Rey, Itziar Ituño, Aura Garrido and Manolo Solo in the lead roles. The film was shot and set in the city of Vitoria-Gasteiz. The film also features an old cathedral of Santa María which was founded in 1180. The film story also resembles the one in the 1991 American film The Silence of the Lambs directed by Jonathan Demme as well as 2006 American film The Da Vinci Code directed by Ron Howard. It was originally released in 2019 and it was streamed via Netflix on 6 March 2020 and opened to mixed reviews from the critics.

Synopsis 
A detective returns to Vitoria-Gasteiz to solve murders mimicking those allegedly committed by a mass serial killer who is set to be released from prison after spending his time in jail for 20 years.

Cast

Production 
The film is a Rodar y Rodar and Atresmedia Cine production.

See also 
 List of Spanish films of 2019

References

External links 
 

2019 crime action films
2019 crime thriller films
2019 action thriller films
2010s mystery thriller films
2010s adventure films
Films scored by Fernando Velázquez
2010s Spanish-language films
Spanish crime action films
Spanish action thriller films
Spanish mystery thriller films
Spanish crime thriller films
Films based on Spanish novels
Films set in Spain
Atresmedia Cine films
Rodar y Rodar films
2010s Spanish films